Gustaf Alfred Lindroos (10 June 1883 – 3 July 1937) was a Finnish metalworker, civil servant and politician. He was a member of the Parliament of Finland from 1921 to 1922, representing the Social Democratic Party of Finland (SDP). He was born in Perniö.

References

1883 births
1937 deaths
People from Salo, Finland
People from Turku and Pori Province (Grand Duchy of Finland)
Swedish-speaking Finns
Social Democratic Party of Finland politicians
Members of the Parliament of Finland (1919–22)